Hinton–Alderson Airport  is a private-use airport located in Pence Springs, West Virginia, between the larger communities of Hinton and Alderson. The airport is privately owned by James Tolley Estate and operated by On Course Aviation LLC.

Facilities 
It has one grass runway designated 10/28 which measures  x .

References

External links 
 
 History of Hinton-Alderson Airport

Airports in West Virginia
Buildings and structures in Summers County, West Virginia
Transportation in Summers County, West Virginia